Ingrid Storholmen (born 22 May 1976 in Verdal, Norway) is a Norwegian poet, novelist and literary critic.

Life and work
Storholmen made her literary debut in 2001 with the poetry collection Krypskyttarloven. Among her other collections are Siriboka from 2007, and Tsjernobylfortellinger (Voices from Chernobyl) from 2009. She was awarded Sultprisen in 2010, and the Ole Vig-prisen in 2011.

Reception
Tore Stavlund, writing on Poetry International, observes that "There is a gravity to Storholmen's poetry. From 2000 onwards, across four publications of poetry and one book of prose, she has developed a poetic language and a set of motifs which shirk neither human tragedy, nor the individual’s search for belonging, whether it be through love or family relationships." Voices from Chernobyl consists of several fictionalized accounts told by Chernobyl survivors, based on interviews Storholmen conducted with real victims. Critics noted how the book's lack of internal continuity reflects the chaos in the wake of the Chernobyl disaster. Storholmen hoped her book would remind people to remember disasters such as Chernobyl and Bhopal and to be wary of dangerous technology.

Bibliography
 Poetry collections
 Krypskyttarloven (The Sniper’s Law) 2001
 Skamtalen Graceland (The Disgraceful Speech, Graceland) 2005
 Siriboka (The Book of Siri) 2007
 Til kjærlighetens pris (In Praise of Love) 2011

 Novels
 Tsjernobylfortellinger (Chernobyl Stories) 2009

References

External links
 A selection of her poems at Poetry International

1976 births
Living people
People from Verdal
21st-century Norwegian poets
Norwegian literary critics
Women literary critics
Norwegian women critics
Norwegian women non-fiction writers
Norwegian women poets
21st-century Norwegian women writers